Tată de duminică (Sunday Father) is a 1975 Romanian film directed by Mihai Constantinescu and starring Amza Pellea, Radu Beligan, Gina Patrichi, Olga Delia Mateescu and Mircea Constantinescu Govora.

Cast
 Amza Pellea –   Mircea Danu
 Radu Beligan -  Grigore Manta
 l Patrichi -  Adriana, ex-wife of Mircea Danu
 Olga Delia Mateescu -  Simona
 Mircea Constantinescu Govora –  Tudor
 Sebastian Constantinescu -  Bogdan, son of Mircea Danu
 l
 Ruxandra Sin -  Maria
 lMihai Cociașu -  George, son of Grigore Manta
 Boris Ciornei -   Maole
 Monica Ghiuță - nurse Suzana
 Cornel Coman -   Manolescu
 Andrei Codarcea – driver - Constantin Neagu
 Cornel Vulpe
 Nae Ștefănescu
 Gheorghe Visu - driver Firică
 Emil Mandric
 Anton Nicolae
 Bogdan Constantinescu
 Ileana Codarcea
 Teodor Mazilu
 Cornelia Turian
 Petre Gheorghiu-Goe
 Dina Protopopescu
 Mario Bălășescu
 Tatiana Iekel
 Gheorghe Negoescu
 Eugenia Ardeleanu
 Alexandru Vasiliu
 Pompilia Vasiliu
 Călin Florian
 Ion Niciu
 Gheorghe Daneș
 Mihai Stoenescu
 Petre Vasilescu
 Ion Smeianu
 Zina Bogos
 Romeo Mogoș
 Petre Kuhn
 Ion Grapini
 Dumitru Ghiuzelea
 Petre Popescu
 Mihai Bucur

References

1975 films
1970s Romanian-language films
Films directed by Mihai Constantinescu
Romanian comedy films
Romanian drama films